Allen Grove or Allen's Grove may refer to:
Allen Grove (Alabama), a plantation in the US
Allen Grove, Tennessee, an unincorporated community
Allen's Grove, Wisconsin, an unincorporated community
Allen Grove, Gauteng, a populated place in South Africa
Allens Grove Township, Mason County, Illinois
Allens Grove Township, Scott County, Iowa